Potra is a Romanian surname. Notable people with the surname include:

Dan Potra (born 1979), Romanian gymnast
Gabriel Potra, Portuguese Paralympian
George Potra (1907–1990), Romanian historian

Romanian-language surnames